Watsonia borbonica, the Cape bugle-lily, is a species of plant in the family Iridaceae that is native to South Africa.

Taxonomy
Watsonia borbonica has two subspecies: W. borbonica subsp. ardernei, and subsp. borbonica. W. borbonica subsp. ardernei is named in honour of H.M. Arderne, the Cape Town businessman whose family established the Arderne Gardens in Claremont . This subspecies is best known for its white form that is well-established in cultivation.

Characteristics
The species grows from corms. It is dormant in summer and grows in winter, which is the rainy season in its native habitat. It has tall strap-like leaves growing in a fan arrangement. It may grow up to two metres tall. It flowers for up to 4–5 weeks in spring.

Distribution and habitat
Watsonia borbonica grows in the winter-rainfall areas of the Western Cape of South Africa. It usually grows on slopes consisting of rocky sandstone or clay and granite. It may be found occasionally in sandy soils.

Cultivation
Watsonia borbonica is a good garden plant as it bears showy flowers. It needs well-drained soil and full sun. During the dormant phase it should be kept dry.

References

Iridaceae